Everton Park State High School is a small school consisting of approximately 400 students located in the northern suburbs of Brisbane, Australia. The Queensland Government gazettal proclamation of 22 September 1960 announced the opening of a Stafford State High School for the beginning of 1961. The school was renamed Everton Park State High School by gazettal proclamation dated 8 December 1960 and opened 23 January 1961 under this name. The actor Geoffrey Rush is one of the school's more notable alumni.

The Metropolitan Region Music Resource Centre is co-located with the school.

Notable alumni 
 Geoffrey Rush, Academy Award-winning actor (1964–1968)
 Glenn Wheatley, talent manager and musician (1961–1963)
 Michelle and Rodney Martin, professional squash players
 Adrian Lam, Australian rugby league football coach and former international player

References

External links 
 Official Website

Public high schools in Brisbane
Educational institutions established in 1961
1961 establishments in Australia